Second Time Around is an American sitcom that aired on UPN during the 2004–05 season. The series was canceled after one season.

Premise
Set in Los Angeles, the show is centered on newlyweds Jackson (an architect) and Ryan Muse (an artist) who remarried after getting divorced three years earlier. Through the run of the show, Jackson and Ryan go through things that normal married couples go through: everything from past relationships to property ownership arguments when moving in with each other. Other characters include Jackson's brother, Nigel, a well-to-do dentist, and his extravagant, gold-digging fiancée Paula. Also included is Coco, a restaurant owner who is Ryan's best friend.

Cast
 Boris Kodjoe as Jackson Muse
 Nicole Ari Parker as Ryan Muse
 Brian J. White as Nigel Muse
 Danielle Nicolet as Paula
 Melissa De Sousa as Coco Herrera
 Mailon Rivera as Omar K. Bone
 Christina Vidal as Gabrielle Herrera

Episodes

References

External links
 

2004 American television series debuts
2005 American television series endings
2000s American black sitcoms
English-language television shows
UPN original programming
Television series by CBS Studios
Television shows set in Los Angeles